Apolinus lividigaster, known as the Yellow-shouldered ladybird, is a small ladybird beetle found in Australia and New Zealand.

References

Coccinellidae
Insects of Australia
Beetles of New Zealand
Beetles described in 1853